Ben Mikael Engdahl (born 17 September 2003) is a Swedish footballer who plays as a full back for Nordsjælland in the Danish Superliga.

Early life
Born and raised in Stockholm, Engdahl played youth football with local club IF Brommapojkarna.

On 3 January 2020, Engdahl joined the youth academy of Hammarby IF. He competed in the 2021–22 UEFA Youth League with the club, getting knocked out by Rangers in the first round through 1–5 on aggregate.

Club career

Hammarby IF
On 21 November 2021, Engdahl made his debut for Hammarby in Allsvenskan in a 4–1 away win against Degerfors IF. In 2022, he made 12 appearances for affiliated club Hammarby TFF in Ettan, the domestic third tier.

Nordsjælland
On 10 August 2022, Engdahl transferred to Nordsjælland in the Danish Superliga, signing a five year-contract.

International career
On 13 November 2021, Engdahl made his debut for the Swedish U19's in a 2–0 home win against Andorra.

Career statistics

Club

References

External links

2003 births
Living people
Swedish footballers
Swedish expatriate footballers
Association football defenders
Sweden youth international footballers
Allsvenskan players
Ettan Fotboll players
Hammarby Fotboll players
Hammarby Talang FF players
FC Nordsjælland players
Footballers from Stockholm
Swedish expatriate sportspeople in Denmark
Expatriate men's footballers in Denmark